Union Minerals and Alloys Corporation was a United States corporation that ran a shipbreaking operation.  In the 1960s and 1970s it purchased many surplus U.S. Navy and U.S. Merchant Marine ships from World War II from the United States Maritime Administration for scrapping.

The company scrapped , an escort carrier; the USS Kenneth Whiting; and the aircraft carriers  and USS Wasp.

The company purchased the submarine  on 29 July 1971 for scrapping.

See also 
Reserve fleet

References 

Ship breaking
Defunct manufacturing companies based in New York City